The centerpiece of contemporary Thanksgiving in the United States and in Canada is Thanksgiving dinner (informally called turkey dinner), a large meal generally centered on a large roasted turkey. Thanksgiving could be considered the largest eating event in the United States as measured by retail sales of food and beverages and by estimates of individual food intake. People often consume as much as three or four thousand calories during the course of the dinner.

Along with attending church services, Thanksgiving dinner remained a central part of celebrations from the holiday's early establishment in North America. In a 2015 Harris Poll, Thanksgiving was the second most popular holiday in the United States (after Christmas), and turkey was the most popular holiday food, regardless of region, generation, gender, or race. At Thanksgiving dinner, turkey is served with a variety of side dishes which can vary from traditional, such as mashed potatoes, stuffing, and cranberry sauce, to ones that reflect regional or cultural heritage.

Given that days of thanksgiving revolve around giving thanks, the saying of grace before Thanksgiving dinner is a traditional feature of the feast. Many of the dishes in a traditional Thanksgiving dinner are made from ingredients native to the Americas, including turkey, potato, sweet potato, corn (maize), squash (including pumpkin), green bean,  and cranberry. The Pilgrims may have learned about some of these foods from Native Americans, but others were not available to the early settlers. The tradition of eating them at Thanksgiving likely reflects their affordability for later Americans.  Early North American settlers did eat turkey, but the lavish feasts that are frequently ascribed to Thanksgiving in the 17th century were a creation of nineteenth-century writers who sought to popularize a unifying holiday in which all Americans could share.

Plymouth Colony and Thanksgiving dinner
The tradition of Thanksgiving dinner has often been associated in popular culture with New England. New England Puritans proclaimed days of thanksgiving to commemorate many specific events. Such days were marked by religious observances, prayer, and sometimes fasting. Church records of the time do not mention food or feasting as being part of such events. A single exception records that following church services in 1636, there was “then makeing merry to the creatures, the poorer sort being invited of the richer.”

On December 11, 1621, Governor Edward Winslow of the Plymouth Colony wrote a letter in hopes of attracting more colonists. In it, he described a three-day feast shared by the Plymouth settlers and the local Wampanoag tribe. Winslow sent out four men who provided a variety of fowls, sufficient to feed the colony for a week, while Massasoit's hunters killed five deer. In the 19th century, this event became associated with the idea of a Thanksgiving feast. In a footnote in 1841, Alexander Young claimed that this event “was the first thanksgiving, the harvest festival of New England”. Jamestown, Virginia and other locations have also been suggested as sites of the "First Thanksgiving".

One of the most persistent advocates for Thanksgiving as a national holiday was writer Sarah Josepha Hale. Although she advocated for Thanksgiving in editorials in Godey’s Lady’s Book from 1837 onwards, Hale did not associate the Pilgrims with Thanksgiving until a brief mention in 1865. In “America's Thanksgiving Hymn,” published in 1872, she credited the Pilgrims as being "free to do and pray, And keep in sober gladness Their first Thanksgiving Day". Hale did not suggest that the Pilgrim thanksgiving included feasting.

Other writers were less discerning. Jane G. Austin published a fictional account of the Pilgrims, Standish of Standish, in 1889. Austin described the Pilgrims, a year after their arrival, as feasting on turkey stuffed with beechnuts, other types of fowl, venison, boiled beef and other roasts, oysters, clam chowder, plum-porridge, hasty pudding, sea biscuit, manchet bread, butter, treacle, mustard, turnips, salad, grapes, plums, popcorn, ale, and root beer. Austin's lavish description disregarded the historical record and the deaths due to starvation and malnutrition that occurred in the Plymouth Colony that winter. Nonetheless, her account was extremely popular. It was repeated by other writers, adapted for plays and public events, and adopted by school curricula. The writings of Austin and others helped to establish the inaccurate image of the Pilgrim Thanksgiving feast in popular culture and make it a part of the national identity of the United States.

Historical menus

The use of the turkey in the United States for Thanksgiving precedes Abraham Lincoln's nationalization of the holiday in 1863. In her 1827 novel Northwood; or, a Tale of New England, Sarah Josepha Hale devoted an entire chapter to Thanksgiving dinner, emphasizing many of the foods that are now considered traditional. Although many other meats are mentioned, "the roasted turkey took precedence on this occasion, being placed at the head of the table; and well did it become its lordly station, sending forth the rich odour of its savoury stuffing". For dessert, "the celebrated pumpkin pie...occupied the most distinguished niche" and was described as "an indispensable part of a good and true Yankee Thanksgiving".

The White House Cook Book, published in 1887 by Fanny Lemira Gillette, had the following menu: oysters on half shell, cream of chicken soup, fried smelts, sauce tartare, roast turkey, cranberry sauce, mashed potatoes, baked squash, boiled onions, parsnip fritters, olives, chicken salad, venison pastry, pumpkin pie, mince pie, Charlotte russe, almond ice cream, lemon jelly, hickory nut cake, cheese, fruits, and coffee.

A Thanksgiving Day dinner served to the Civilian Conservation Corps in 1935 included: pickles, green olives, celery, roast turkey, oyster stew, cranberry sauce, giblet gravy, dressing, creamed asparagus tips, snowflake potatoes, baked carrots, hot rolls, fruit salad, mince pie, fruitcake, candies, grapes, apples, clams, fish, and many other foods, along with French drip coffee, cigars, and cigarettes.

Sugar, among other food commodities, was rationed from 1942 to 1946. In 1947, as part of a voluntary rationing campaign, the Truman administration attempted to promote "Poultryless Thursdays," discouraging Americans from eating poultry or egg products on Thursdays. Because Thanksgiving is always on a Thursday, this meant that turkey and pumpkin pie, two Thanksgiving staples, would be discouraged (pumpkin pie because it contains eggs). The National Poultry and Egg Board furiously lobbied the President to cease promoting the plan, culminating in an agreement at the National Thanksgiving Turkey Presentation shortly before Thanksgiving in 1947. Turkey was no longer discouraged, but Eggless Thursdays remained for the rest of the year, meaning no pumpkin pie was served at the White House dinner that year.

Main dishes

Turkey
Turkey is the most common main dish of a Thanksgiving dinner, to the point that Thanksgiving is sometimes colloquially called "Turkey Day." Alexander Hamilton proclaimed that "no citizen of the United States should refrain from turkey on Thanksgiving Day", and Benjamin Franklin had high regard for the wild turkey as an American icon. As Thanksgiving Day rose in popularity during the 1800s, so too did the turkey. By 1857, turkey had become part of the traditional dinner in New England.

The domestic turkey eaten now is very different from the wild turkey known to the Pilgrims, Hamilton, and Franklin. Wild turkeys are native to the Americas and evolved around 5 million years ago. At least five subspecies are still found in 48 states, Mexico, and Canada. Today, the southern Mexico subspecies Meleagris gallopavo gallopavo is almost extinct, but in the early 16th century it was taken to Europe from Mexico by the Spanish. Its descendants later returned to America. Twentieth century commercial varieties of turkey were bred from these European descendants. 

The Beltsville Small White turkey was bred by the USDA at the Beltsville Agricultural Research Center in Maryland in response to consumer demand for a small (8-15 pound) turkey with more white meat and no dark feathers. It was introduced commercially in 1947 and dominated the market for nearly 20 years. The Small White was supplanted by the Broad Breasted White turkey, bred specifically for large feasts such as Thanksgiving. These turkeys can grow to over 40 pounds, but the breed must be artificially bred and suffers from health problems due to its size. It is estimated that more than 99% of the American turkeys eaten are Broad Breasted Whites. In 2006, American turkey growers were expected to raise 270 million turkeys, to be processed into five billion pounds of turkey meat valued at almost $8 billion, with one third of all turkey consumption occurring in the Thanksgiving-Christmas season (and a fifth of the overall total coming from Thanksgiving alone), and a per capita consumption of almost .

Thanksgiving turkey is often stuffed with a traditional savory bread pudding and roasted. Sage is the standard herb added to the stuffing, along with chopped onions and celery. Other ingredients, such as chopped chestnuts or other tree nuts, crumbled sausage or bacon, carrots, cranberries, raisins, and/or apples, may be added to stuffing. If the mixture is cooked outside the bird, a stock is generally added to prevent it from drying out. A number of cultural and regional factors affect whether this is referred to as "stuffing" or "dressing". Turkeys may be deep-fried instead of roasted due to the shorter preparation time, but this method carries higher safety risks.

The consumption of turkey on Thanksgiving is so ingrained in American culture that each year since 1947, the National Turkey Federation (and, as far back as 1873, commercial turkey farmers) has presented a live turkey to the President of the United States prior to each Thanksgiving. These turkeys were initially slaughtered and eaten for the President's Thanksgiving dinner; since 1989, the presented turkeys have typically been given a mock pardon to great fanfare and sent to a park to live out the rest of their usually short natural lives.

Alternatives to turkey
Entrees other than turkey are sometimes served at Thanksgiving dinner, either alongside the turkey or in place of it as the main dish. Baked ham is served at Thanksgiving in many households. Roasted goose or duck, foods which were traditional European centerpieces of Christmas dinners, are sometimes served in place of a Thanksgiving turkey. Italian Americans might serve capon as the main course to the Thanksgiving meal. Irish Americans might have prime rib as their centerpiece; since beef in Ireland was once a rarity, families would save up money for this dish to signify newfound prosperity and hope.

Sometimes, fowl native to the region where the meal is taking place are used; for example, Texas Monthly magazine suggested quail as a main dish. In a few areas on the West Coast of the United States, Dungeness crab is common as an alternate main dish, as crab season starts in early November. Similarly, Thanksgiving falls within deer hunting season in the Northeastern United States, and as such venison is sometimes used as a centerpiece. In Alaskan villages, whale meat is sometimes eaten.

John Madden, a commentator on televised NFL Thanksgiving Day games from 1981 to 2001, advocated for turducken: deboned turkey, duck and chicken nested inside each other and then cooked.

At the other end of the spectrum, vegetarians or vegans may choose a tofu, seitan, or lentil-based substitute such as tofurky, or serve vegetable-based dishes such as stuffed squash, which are more often considered sides. Vegetarian menus for Thanksgiving date back to at least 1897, when they were discussed by the Vegetarian Club of the University of Chicago.

Due to the impacts of immigration in the United States, an international approach to Thanksgiving has become common. Basic Thanksgiving dishes can be transformed by using flavors, techniques, and traditions from immigrants' own cuisines. Others celebrate the holiday with a variety of standard and multicultural dishes, particularly when there is a crowd to be fed, as guests' tastes can vary.

A live raccoon was sent from Mississippi to the White House intended to be served for the 1926 Thanksgiving feast.  Calvin and Grace Coolidge decided to keep her as a pet instead, and named her Rebecca.

Side dishes
Many offerings are typically served alongside the main dish. Copious leftovers are also common following the meal proper. Traditional Thanksgiving foods are sometimes specific to the day, and although some of the dishes might be seen at any semi-formal meal in the United States, the Thanksgiving dinner often has something of a ritual or traditional quality to it.

Many Americans would regard Thanksgiving dinner as "incomplete" without stuffing, mashed potatoes with gravy, and cranberry sauce. A recipe for cranberry sauce to be served with turkey appeared in the first American cookbook, American Cookery (1796) by Amelia Simmons. Commonly served vegetable dishes include mashed winter squash, turnips, and sweet potatoes, the latter often prepared with sweeteners such as brown sugar, molasses, or marshmallows. All three can be served mashed or roasted. Other vegetables are often served, such as carrots or parsnips, beets, radishes, asparagus, Brussels sprouts, and/or cauliflower. Creamed corn is also popular. 

Green beans are frequently served; in particular, green bean casserole. The recipe was invented in 1955 by Dorcas Reilly for the Campbell Soup Company to promote use of its canned cream of mushroom soup. It has since become a Thanksgiving standard.

A fresh salad may be included, especially on the West Coast. A charcuterie board or relish tray, with various cheese, cured meats, crackers, pickles, olives, onions or peppers, is often included either with the meal itself or as a pre-meal appetizer. Bread rolls, biscuits, or cornbread, the latter particularly in the South and parts of New England, may also be served, and macaroni and cheese is a common side dish in some Southern coastal areas.

Desserts
For dessert, various pies are usually served. Harriet Beecher Stowe described pie as "an English institution, which, transplanted on American soil, forthwith ran rampant and burst forth into an untold variety of genera and species." Pumpkin pie is widely regarded as the most popular and most traditional, but apple pie and pecan pie are also common favorites. Sweet potato pie, mince pie, cherry pie, and chocolate cream pie are served as well.

Beverages
The beverages at Thanksgiving can vary as much as the side dishes, often depending on who is present at the table and their tastes. In the late eighteenth and early nineteenth centuries, it was usual for Americans to consume hard cider and alcoholic punches. Prohibition in the 1920s restricted legal Thanksgiving options to milk, water, and lemonade. Pitchers of sweet tea were often found on Southern tables even before prohibition and remain popular. Coffee is also frequently served at the end of Thanksgiving dinner.

Spirits or cocktails may be offered before the main meal. On the dinner table, unfermented apple cider (still or sparkling) or wine are often served. Beaujolais nouveau is sometimes served; the beverage has been marketed as a Thanksgiving drink since the producers of the wine (which is made available only for a short window each year) set the annual release date to be one week before Thanksgiving beginning in 1985, and it is said to pair well with the wide variety of food served for Thanksgiving dinner. Thanksgiving marks the initial peak for seasonal consumption of eggnog, which is followed by a larger peak at Christmas.

Regional differences

There are many regional differences as to what gets served for Thanksgiving dinner. Each state and region has its own preferences, starting with the stuffing or dressing traditionally served with the turkey. The common version is some form of mixture of white bread cubes, sage, onion, celery and parsley. Southerners generally make their dressing from cornbread, while those in other parts of the country may opt for wheat, rye, or sourdough bread as the base. The addition of ingredients such as oysters, apples, chestnuts, raisins, and sausage or the turkey's giblets may also reflect regional and historic differences.

Other dishes likewise reflect the regional, cultural, or ethnic backgrounds of those who have come together for the meal. Many African Americans and Southerners serve baked macaroni and cheese and collard greens, along with chitterlings and sweet potato pie. Sauerkraut is sometimes served in the Mid-Atlantic, especially by Baltimoreans of German and Eastern European descent. Many Midwesterners (such as Minnesotans) of Norwegian or Scandinavian descent set the table with lefse. Italian Americans often include antipasti, pasta, and lasagna dishes.

Mexican Americans may serve their turkey with mole and roasted corn. In Puerto Rico, the Thanksgiving meal is completed with arroz con gandules (rice with pigeon peas) or arroz con maiz (rice with corn), pasteles (root tamales) stuffed with turkey, pumpkin-coconut crème caramel, corn bread with longaniza, potato salad, roasted white sweet potatoes and Spanish sparkling hard cider. Turkey in Puerto Rico is often stuffed with mofongo. Cuban Americans traditionally serve the turkey alongside a small roasted pork and include white rice and black beans or kidney beans.

Preparation and timing
Because of the amount of food, preparation for the Thanksgiving meal may begin early in the day or during the days prior. The turkey generally takes hours to prepare, cook, and "rest" before serving. Many side dishes can be at least partially prepared in advance, and pies may be popular desserts in part because they can be baked days or weeks in advance and stored. It is common for family members and friends from different households to bring dishes to a joint meal.

The meal is often served in the early or middle afternoon. Maria Parloa, an early New England domestic scientist cautioned against eating too early in the day, because of the increased pressure on the cook:

See also
 List of dining events

References

External links

American cuisine
Canadian cuisine
Meal

Dinner
Dining events